The Education of the Virgin is a painting by the Flemish artist Michaelina Wautier. It shows the young Virgin Mary with her mother Anne and her father Joachim. In the pillar on the right is the inscription "Michaelina Wautier, inuenit, et fecit 1656", indicating that she both composed and executed the painting in 1656. The work is now in a private collection.

References

Paintings by Michaelina Wautier
1656 paintings
Books in art
Paintings of the Virgin Mary